Lenny Trčková (born August 5, 1978) is a Czech radio presenter, TV presenter and model. She lives in Prague.

She hosts Host Óčka ("Ocko's guest") and Inbox TV shows on Czech music channel Óčko. She also hosts I.D. and Ranní kuropění - Wake up call shows on Czech radio station ČRo 4 – Radio Wave.

Biography 
Trčková was born in Slavičín, Czechoslovakia (now Czech Republic) where she also studied and graduated from secondary school, with a major in economics. She worked in many areas of economics until 2001. During that time she was also interested in cultural and musical events, helping to run a movie theatre, and co-founding a local music festival, Festiválek.

In 1999 she moved to Prague and began working as a radio presenter and TV presenter. She worked with radio Frekvence 1 (Na titulní straně), Fajn rádio (Fajn ráno), Express radio (D'rano) and on TV Praha (Maestro) and Czech television (Styl  ).

Later, she started to host movie premieres and special events (Elite Model Look, Hairdresser of the year, Diesel party, Fashion show of Klára Nademlýnská etc.).

Personal 
Trčková’s main hobbies are music, singing, books, horse riding, design and fashion.

References

External links 

Trčková on Osobnosti.cz (in Czech)

1978 births
Living people
People from Slavičín
Czech television personalities
Czech television presenters